Kings Hammer FC is a pre-professional soccer club that plays in Cincinnati, Ohio and based in Covington, Kentucky competing in the Great Lakes Division in USL League Two.

History
The club was founded in 2013 through the merger of Kings Soccer Academy with Hammer FC, but its roots go back to 1993. They have won a US National Youth championship.

In 2020, they added a U23 team in the Ohio Valley Premier League, winning the league's inaugural season in the Fall of 2020. In 2021, they joined USL League Two, the top amateur division in the United States, while still planning to operate their OVPL team.

Year-by-year

Notable former players
 Jacob Goodall, Kings Hammer SC - 2021, signed in 2021 by Greenville Triumph SC
 Rizwaan Dharsey, Kings Hammer SC - 2021, signed in 2021 by Vitória Futebol Clube - Pico

References

External links

USL League Two teams
Soccer clubs in Ohio
Association football clubs established in 2013
2013 establishments in Ohio
Sports teams in Cincinnati